Bart is a masculine given name and a surname, and as an acronym, most frequently refers to Bay Area Rapid Transit. 

Bart or BART may also refer to:

Acronym
 Best Available Retrofit Technology, review or rule required under the U.S. Clean Air Act
 Bombardier Advanced Rapid Transit (now INNOVIA Metro), a family of linear induction motor-based Bombardier metro trains
 Basic Aerodynamics Research Tunnel, a wind tunnel facility at the NASA Langley Research Center
 Berkshire Arts & Technology Charter Public School (BArT), located in Adams, Massachusetts
 BART superfamily (Bile/Arsenite/Riboflavin Transporter), a superfamily of transport proteins

Places
 Bart, Doubs, a commune in France
 Bart Township, Lancaster County, Pennsylvania, United States

Other uses
 Bart.,  an abbreviation for the peerage title Baronet
 Bart (magazine), a discontinued Japanese magazine
 Bart, a 2000 album made by Marcus Schmickler and Thomas Lehn on Erstwhile Records
 BART (instrumental), an instrumental track from the eponymous album by the band Ruby
 Typhoon Bart (disambiguation)
 Collège Bart, a private college in Quebec City, Quebec, Canada
 Bart Simpson, a main character from the television show The Simpsons

See also
 BartPE, an abbreviation of Bart's Preinstalled Environment, a lightweight variant of a Windows operating system
 Bart syndrome, a genetic disorder
 "Barts", a frequently used abbreviation for St Bartholomew's Hospital in the City of London
 Barth (disambiguation), sometimes pronounced "Bart"